La muerte camina en la lluvia (English: The death walks in the rain) is a 1948 Argentine suspense film directed by Carlos Hugo Christensen and based upon the novel L'assassin habite au 21 written by Stanislas-André Steeman. It was premiered on September 7, 1948.

In a survey of the 100 greatest films of Argentine cinema carried out by the Museo del Cine Pablo Ducrós Hicken in 2000, the film reached the 35th position.

Plot
A series of seven mysterious murders frightens Buenos Aires, all the crimes are committed during rainy days.

Cast
In alphabetical order
 Pablo Acciardi ... Merlín
 Alfredo Alaria ... Joven en la prueba de magia
 Alberto Barcel ... Policía
 Guillermo Battaglia ... Boris Andreieff
 Angel Boffa ... Barquinazo
 Juan Corona ... Lamas
 Margarita Corona ... Valeria Duval
 Eduardo Cuitiño ... Lima
 Roberto Escalada ... Relator
 Nicolás Fregues ... Doctor Robledo
 Ramón J. Garay ...Conserje
 Agustín Orrequia ... Camelio Vargas
 Carlos Perelli ... Norton
 Horacio Peterson ... Lucho Rivas
 Amalia Sánchez Ariño ... Sra. Vargas
 Orestes Soriani ... Doctor Kaplan
 Olga Zubarry ... Lila Espinoza

See also
The Murderer Lives at Number 21 (1942)

References

External links
 

1948 films
1940s Spanish-language films
Argentine black-and-white films
Films directed by Carlos Hugo Christensen
Remakes of French films
Films based on Belgian novels
Argentine mystery films
1948 mystery films
1940s Argentine films
Films based on works by Stanislas-André Steeman